Blästrad levande is a live album by hardcore band LOK, released in 2003.

Track listing
 "Intro"
 "Kompanjoner"
 "Hur många grisar är vi nu?"
 "Scudmissil (den lede fi)"
 "Skrubbsår"
 "Oj oj oj (hejdå klick)"
 "Passa dig"
 "Stänkskärmar och sprit"
 "Lägg av"
 "Sug min"
 "Ta stryk"
 "Bedragaren i Murmansk"
 "Taftamanabag"
 "Tommys ponny"
 "Ensam gud"
 "Staden Göteborg"
 "LOK står när de andra faller"
 "Rosa"
 "Outro"

Credits
 Martin Westerstrand – Vocals
 Thomas Brandt – Guitar
 Daniel Cordero – Bass
 Johan Reivén – Drums

LOK (band) albums
2003 live albums